In mathematics, the   Turán number T(n,k,r) for  r-uniform hypergraphs of order n is the smallest number of r-edges such that every induced subgraph on k vertices contains an edge. The paper  gives a survey of Turán numbers.

Definitions
Fix a set X of n vertices. For given r, an r-edge or block is a set of r vertices. A set of blocks is called a Turán (n,k,r) system (n ≥ k ≥ r) if every k-element subset of X contains a block.
The    Turán number T(n,k,r) is the minimum size of such a system.

Example
The complements of the lines of the Fano plane form a Turán (7,5,4)-system. T(7,5,4) = 7.

Relations to other combinatorial designs
It can be shown that

Equality holds if and only if there exists a Steiner system S(n - k, n - r, n).

An (n,r,k,r)-lotto design is an (n, k, r)-Turán system. Thus, T(n,k, r) = L(n,r,k,r).

See also
Forbidden subgraph problem
Combinatorial design

References

Bibliography
 

Extremal graph theory
Combinatorial design